Phaistos Disc is a Unicode block containing the characters found on the undeciphered Phaistos Disc artefact.

Block

History
The following Unicode-related documents record the purpose and process of defining specific characters in the Phaistos Disc block:

References 

Unicode blocks
Computer-related introductions in 2008
Science and technology in Greece
Palaeography